The 2009 Hong Kong Super Series was a top level badminton competition which was held from November 10, 2009 to November 14, 2009 in Hong Kong. It was the 11th BWF Superseries competition on the 2009 BWF Super Series schedule. The total purse for the event was $250,000.

Men's singles

Seeds
 Lee Chong Wei
 Lin Dan 
 Peter Gade
 Chen Jin
 Taufik Hidayat
 Park Sung-Hwan
 Nguyễn Tiến Minh
 Boonsak Ponsana

Results

Women's singles

Seeds
 Wang Lin
 Zhou Mi
 Wang Yihan
 Tine Rasmussen
 Pi Hongyan
 Jiang Yanjiao
 Lu Lan
 Saina Nehwal

Results

Men's doubles

Seeds
 Markis Kido / Hendra Setiawan
 Koo Kien Keat / Tan Boon Heong
 Jung Jae-sung / Lee Yong-dae
 Cai Yun / Fu Haifeng
 Mohd Zakry Abdul Latif / Mohd Fairuzizuan Mohd Tazari
 Alvent Yulianto / Hendra Aprida Gunawan
 Lars Paaske / Jonas Rasmussen
 Choong Tan Fook / Lee Wan Wah

Results

Women's doubles

Seeds
 Chin Eei Hui / Wong Pei Tty
 Cheng Shu / Zhao Yunlei
 Du Jing / Yu Yang
 Ma Jin / Wang Xiaoli
 Ha Jung-eun / Lee Kyung-won
 Tian Qing / Zhang Yawen
 Chien Yu-Chin / Wang Pei-Rong
 Kim Min-jung / Park Sun-young

Results

Mixed doubles

Seeds
 Lee Yong-dae / Lee Hyo-jung
 Zheng Bo / Ma Jin
 Nova Widianto / Liliyana Natsir
 Thomas Laybourn / Kamilla Rytter Juhl
 He Hanbin / Yu Yang
 Joachim Fischer Nielsen / Christinna Pedersen
 Hendra Aprida Gunawan / Vita Marissa
 Valiyaveetil Diju / Jwala Gutta

Results

References

External links
Hong Kong Super Series 2009 at tournamentsoftware.com

Hong Kong Open (badminton)
J
Badminton in Hong Kong
Hong Kong